Jaan Mälberg (13 May 1888 Toolamaa Parish, Võru County – 9 March 1947 Tartu) was an Estonian politician. He was a member of III Riigikogu. He was a member of the Riigikogu since 11 November 1926. He replaced Jüri Jaakson.

References

1888 births
1947 deaths
Members of the Riigikogu, 1926–1929